Deh Sefid-e Vosta (also Romanized as Deh Sefīd-e Vosţá; also known as Deh Sefīd-e Moţahharī and Deh Sefīd Moţahharī) is a village in Zagheh Rural District, Zagheh District, Khorramabad County, Lorestan Province, Iran. At the 2006 census, its population was 122, in 27 families.

References 

Towns and villages in Khorramabad County